Sheykhian Solonji (also Romanized as Sheykhīān Solonjī; also known as Kūrī and Sheykhīān) is a village in Kabgan Rural District, Kaki District, Dashti County, Bushehr Province, Iran. At the 2006 census, its population was 178, in 34 families.

References 

Populated places in Dashti County